El Dorado (Spanish for "The Golden") is an unincorporated community in El Dorado County, California. The population was 4,096 at the 2000 census. The town is registered as California Historical Landmark #486. The ZIP code is 95623. The community is inside area code 530.

History
El Dorado, "The Gilded One", was first known as Mud Springs from the boggy quagmire the cattle and horses made of a nearby watering place. Originally an important camp on the old Carson Trail, by 1849-50 it had become the center of a mining district and the crossroads for freight and stagecoach lines. At the height of the rush its large gold production supported a population of several thousand. It was incorporated as the town of El Dorado in 1856.

The first post office in Mud Spring was opened in 1851, the name was changed to El Dorado in 1855. The town incorporated in 1855 and disincorporated in 1857.

Politics

References

External links

Unincorporated communities in California
Unincorporated communities in El Dorado County, California
California Historical Landmarks
Unincorporated communities in the Sacramento metropolitan area
Populated places established in 1849
1849 establishments in California